Jeremiah Kuder (July 12, 1835 - May 25, 1916) was an American soldier who fought in the American Civil War. Kuder received his country's highest award for bravery during combat, the Medal of Honor. Kuder's medal was won for capturing the flag of the actions during the Battle of Jonesborough on September 1, 1864. He was honored with the award on April 7, 1865.

Kuder was born in Tiffin, Ohio, entered service in Warsaw, Indiana, and was later buried at the Marion National Cemetery in Marion, Indiana.

Medal of Honor citation

See also
List of American Civil War Medal of Honor recipients: G–L

References

1835 births
1916 deaths
American Civil War recipients of the Medal of Honor
People of Indiana in the American Civil War
Union Army officers
United States Army Medal of Honor recipients